In enzymology, a tartrate epimerase is an enzyme that catalyzes the chemical reaction

(R,R)-tartrate  meso-tartrate

Hence, this enzyme has one substrate, (R,R)-tartrate, and one product, meso-tartrate.

This enzyme belongs to the family of isomerases, specifically those racemases and epimerases acting on hydroxy acids and derivatives.  The systematic name of this enzyme class is tartrate epimerase. This enzyme is also called tartaric racemase.  This enzyme participates in glyoxylate and dicarboxylate metabolism.

References

 

EC 5.1.2
Enzymes of unknown structure